"Vishwavikhyathamaya Mookku" (The World-Renowned Nose) is a short story written by Vaikom Muhammad Basheer and published in 1954 in an anthology of the same name. The story is regarded as a classic in Malayalam literature.

Plot summary
The story is a socio-political satire about an illiterate cook whose nose starts to grow from the day he turns 24. The nose is grown like an elephant's nose. The poor cook becomes rich in no time and starts to give opinions on international matters. The story expands on the shortcomings of this long nose of the ordinary man. By using this simple topic nose, Basheer is exposing the social conduct through comedy.

Publication
"Vishwavikhyathamaya Mookku" was published as a book in 1954 by S.P.C.S. in an anthology by the same name. The following stories are included in this collection:
 "Vishwavikhyathamaya Mookku"
 "Neethinyayam"
 "Pazhaya Oru Kochu Premakatha"

Translations

References

Further reading
 Neeta Gupta. "Vaikom Muhammad Basheer's 'The World-Renowned Nose': An Analysis". Jaipur: Central Sanskrit University
 

Short stories by Vaikom Muhammad Basheer
Malayalam short stories
1954 short stories